Shapur II (New Persian: , Šāpur, 309–379), also known as Shapur the Great, was the tenth Sasanian King of Kings (Shahanshah) of Iran. The longest-reigning monarch in Iranian history, he reigned for the entirety of his 70-year life, from 309 to 379. He was the son of Hormizd II (r. 302–309).

His reign saw the military resurgence of the country, and the expansion of its territory, which marked the start of the first Sasanian golden era. He is thus along with Shapur I, Kavad I and Khosrow I, regarded as one of the most illustrious Sasanian kings. His three direct successors, on the other hand, were less successful. At the age of 16, he launched enormously successful military campaigns against Arab insurrections and tribes who knew him as 'Dhū'l-Aktāf ("he who pierces shoulders"). 

Shapur II pursued a harsh religious policy. Under his reign, the collection of the Avesta, the sacred texts of Zoroastrianism, was completed, heresy and apostasy were punished, and Christians were persecuted. The latter was a reaction against the Christianization of the Roman Empire by Constantine the Great. Shapur II, like Shapur I, was amicable towards Jews, who lived in relative freedom and gained many advantages in his period (see also Rava). At the time of Shapur's death, the Sasanian Empire was stronger than ever, with its enemies to the east pacified and Armenia under Sasanian control.

 Etymology 
"Shapur" was a popular name in Sasanian Iran, being used by three Sasanian monarchs and other notables of the Sasanian era and its later periods. Derived from Old Iranian *xšayaθiya.puθra ("son of a king"), it must initially have been a title, which became—at least in the late 2nd century AD—a personal name. It appears in the list of Arsacid kings in some Arabic-Persian sources, however, this is anachronistic. Shapur is transliterated in other languages as; Greek Sapur, Sabour and Sapuris; Latin Sapores and Sapor; Arabic Sābur and Šābur; New Persian Šāpur, Šāhpur, Šahfur.

 Accession 

When Hormizd II died in 309, he was succeeded by his son Adur Narseh, who, after a brief reign which lasted few months, was killed by some of the nobles of the empire. They then blinded the second, and imprisoned the third (Hormizd, who afterwards escaped to the Roman Empire). The throne was reserved for the unborn child of Hormizd II's wife Ifra Hormizd, which was Shapur II. It is said that Shapur II may have been the only king in history to be crowned in utero, as the story claims that the crown was placed upon his mother's womb while she was pregnant.

This story has been challenged: according to Alireza Shapour Shahbazi, it is unlikely that Shapur was crowned as king while still in his mother's womb, since the nobles could not have known of his sex at that time; however, Edward Gibbon relates that the Magi had prophesied that the child would be a boy. Shahbazi further states that Shapur was born forty days after his father's death, and that the nobles killed Adur Narseh and crowned Shapur II in order to gain greater control of the empire, which they were able to do until Shapur II reached his maturity at the age of 16.

War with the Arabs (325)

During the childhood of Shapur II, Arab nomads raided the Sasanian homeland of Pars, particularly the district of Ardashir-Khwarrah and the shore of the Persian Gulf. At the age of 16, Shapur II led an expedition against the Arabs; primarily campaigning against the Iyad tribe in Asoristan and thereafter he crossed the Persian Gulf, reaching al-Khatt, modern Qatif, or present eastern Saudi Arabia. He then attacked the Banu Tamim in the Al Hajar Mountains. Shapur II reportedly killed a large number of the Arab population and destroyed their water supplies by stopping their wells with sand.

After having dealt with the Arabs of eastern Arabia, he continued his expedition into western Arabia and Syria, where he attacked several cities—he even went as far as Medina. Because of his cruel way of dealing with the Arabs, he was called Dhū'l-Aktāf ("he who pierces shoulders") by them. Not only did Shapur II pacify the Arabs of the Persian Gulf, but he also pushed many Arab tribes further deep into the Arabian Peninsula. Furthermore, he also deported some Arab tribes by force; the Taghlib to Bahrain and al-Khatt; the Banu Abdul Qays and Banu Tamim to Hajar; the Banu Bakr to Kirman, and the Banu Hanzalah to a place near Hormizd-Ardashir. Shapur II, in order to prevent the Arabs from making more raids into his country, ordered the construction of a wall near al-Hira, which became known as war-i tāzigān ("wall of the Arabs").

The Zoroastrian scripture Bundahishn also mentions the Arabian campaign of Shapur II:

With Eastern Arabia more firmly under Sasanian control, and with the establishment of Sasanian garrison troops, the way for Zoroastrianism was opened. Pre-Islamic Arabian poets often makes mention of Zoroastrianism practices, which they must have either made contact with in Asoristan or Eastern Arabia. The Lakhmid ruler Imru' al-Qays ibn 'Amr, who was originally a vassal of the Sasanians, may have suffered from Shapur II's raids in Peninsula. He seemingly swore fealty to the Romans, possibly after the incident.

 War with the Romans 

 Objectives 
Ever since the "humilating" Peace of Nisibis concluded between Shapur's grandfather Narseh and the Roman emperor Diocletian in 299, the borders between the two empires had changed largely in favor of the Romans, who in the treaty received a handful of provinces in Mesopotamia, changing the border from the Euphrates to the Tigris, close to the Sasanian capital of Ctesiphon. The Romans also received control over the kingdoms of Iberia and Armenia, and gained control over parts of upper Media in Iran proper. Shapur's primary objective was thus to nullify the treaty, which he spent much of his reign in order to accomplish.

Another reason behind his motives to wage war against the Romans was due their attempts to meddle in the domestic affairs of the Sasanian Empire and hurt Shapur's kingship by supporting his brother Hormizd, who had been well received at the Roman court by Constantine the Great, who made him a cavalry commander. Shapur had made fruitless attempts to satisfy his brother, even having his wife sent to him, who had originally helped him escape imprisonment. However, Hormizd had already become an avid philhellene during his stay with the Romans, with whom he felt at home. Another reason was due to Constantine, who at his deathbed in 337, had declared Christianity as the official religion of the Roman Empire. He had also selected himself as the defender of all the Christians in the world, including those living in the Sasanian realm.

 Early campaigns and first war against the Romans 

In 337, just before the death of Constantine the Great (324–337), Shapur II, provoked by the Roman rulers' backing of Roman Armenia, broke the peace concluded in 297 between emperors Narseh (293–302) and Diocletian (284–305), which had been observed for forty years. This was the beginning of two long, drawn-out wars (337–350 and 358–363) which were inadequately recorded.

After crushing a rebellion in the south, Shapur II invaded Roman Mesopotamia and captured Armenia. Apparently, nine major battles were fought. The most renowned was the inconclusive Battle of Singara (modern Sinjar, Iraq) in which Constantius II was at first successful, capturing the Persian camp, only to be driven out by a surprise night attack after Shapur had rallied his troops (344 or 348?). The most notable feature of this war was the consistently successful defence of the Roman fortress city of Nisibis in Mesopotamia. Shapur besieged the city thrice (in 338, 346, 350 CE), and was repulsed each time.

Although victorious in battle, Shapur II could make no further progress with Nisibis untaken. At the same time he was attacked in the east by Scythian Massagetae and other Central Asia nomads. He had to break off the war with the Romans and arrange a hasty truce in order to pay attention to the east (350). Roughly around this time the Hunnic tribes, most likely the Kidarites, whose king was Grumbates, make an appearance as an encroaching threat upon Sasanian territory as well as a menace to the Gupta Empire (320–500 CE). After a prolonged struggle (353–358) they were forced to conclude a peace, and Grumbates agreed to enlist his light cavalrymen into the Persian army and accompany Shapur II in renewed war against the Romans, particularly participating in the Siege of Amida in 359.

 Second war against the Romans and invasion of Armenia 

In 358 Shapur II was ready for his second series of wars against Rome, which met with much more success. In 359, Shapur II invaded southern Armenia, but was held up by the valiant Roman defence of the fortress of Amida (now Diyarbakır, Turkey), which finally surrendered in 359 after a seventy-three-day siege in which the Persian army suffered great losses. The delay forced Shapur to halt operations for the winter. Early the following spring he continued his operations against the Roman fortresses, capturing Singara and Bezabde (Cizre?), again at a heavy cost. In the next year Constantius II launched a counterattack, having spent the winter making massive preparations in Constantinople; Shapur, who had meanwhile lost the aid of his Asianic allies, avoided battle, but left strong garrisons in all the fortresses which he had captured. Constantius laid siege to Bazabde, but proved incapable of taking it, and retired on the approach of winter to Antioch, where he died soon after.
Constantius was succeeded by his cousin, Julian the Apostate, who came to the throne determined to avenge the recent Roman reverses in the east. Though Shapur attempted an honorable reconciliation, warned of the capabilities which Julian had displayed in wars against the Alemans in Gaul, the emperor dismissed negotiation.

In 363 the Emperor Julian (361–363), at the head of a strong army, advanced to Shapur's capital city of Ctesiphon and defeated a presumably larger Sassanian force at the Battle of Ctesiphon; however, he was unable to take the fortified city, or engage with the main Persian army under Shapur II that was approaching. Julian was killed by the enemy in a skirmish during his retreat back to Roman territory. His successor Jovian (363–364) made an ignominious peace in which the districts beyond the Tigris which had been acquired in 298 were given to the Persians along with Nisibis and Singara, and the Romans promised to interfere no more in Armenia. The great success is represented in the rock sculptures near the town Bishapur in Pars (Stolze, Persepolis, p. 141); under the hooves of the king's horse lies the body of an enemy, probably Julian, and a supplicant Roman, the Emperor Jovian, asks for peace.

According to the peace treaty between Shapur and Jovian, Georgia and Armenia were to be ceded to Sasanian control, and the Romans forbidden from further involvement in the affairs of Armenia. Under this agreement Shapur assumed control over Armenia and took its King Arsaces II (Arshak II), the faithful ally of the Romans, as prisoner, and held him in the Castle of Oblivion (Fortress of Andməš in Armenian or Castle of Anyuš in Ḵuzestān). Supposedly, Arsaces then committed suicide during a visit by his eunuch Drastamat. Shapur attempted to introduce Zoroastrian orthodoxy into Armenia. However, the Armenian nobles resisted him successfully, secretly supported by the Romans, who sent King Papas (Pap), the son of Arsaces II, into Armenia. The war with Rome threatened to break out again, but the Roman emperor Valens sacrificed Pap, arranging for his assassination in Tarsus, where he had taken refuge (374).

In Georgia, then known as Iberia, where the Sasanians were also given control, Shapur II installed Aspacures II of Iberia in the east; however, in western Georgia, Valens also succeeded in setting up his own king, Sauromaces II of Iberia.

Shapur II had conducted great hosts of captives from the Roman territory into his dominions, most of whom were settled in Elam. Here he rebuilt Susa—after having killed the city's rebellious inhabitants.

War in the East
Expansion into India (c. 350–358 CE)
Gandhara and Punjab

In the east around 350 CE, Shapur II gained the upper hand against the Kushano-Sasanian Kingdom and took control of large territories in areas now known as Afghanistan and Pakistan, possibly as a consequence of the destruction of the Kushano-Sasanians by the Chionites. The Kushano-Sasanian still ruled in the north. Important finds of Sasanian coinage beyond the Indus river in the city of Taxila only start with the reigns of Shapur II (r. 309–379) and Shapur III (r. 383–388), suggesting that the expansion of Sasanian control beyond the Indus was the result of the wars of Shapur II "with the Chionites and Kushans" from 350 to 358 CE as described by Ammianus Marcellinus. During the last phase of the reign of Shapur II, a Sasanian mint was established south of the Hindu Kush, the role of which was probably to pay local troops. The Sasanians probably maintained control until Bactria fell to the Kidarites under their ruler Kidara around 360 CE, and Kabulistan fell to the Alchon Huns circa 385 CE.

Sindh

In the area of Sindh, from Multan to the mouth of the Indus river, an important series of gold coins started to be issued on the model of the coinage of Shapur II, and would continue down to Peroz I. The coins are not the usual Sasanian imperial type, and the legend around the portrait tends to be degraded Middle Persian in the Pahlavi script, but they have the Brahmi script character Sri  (meaning "Lord") in front of the portrait of the King. The coins suggest some sort of Sasanian control of Sind from the time of Shapur II, and a recognition of Sasanian overlordship, but the precise extent of the Sasanian presence or influence is unknown.

Loss of Bactria to nomadic invaders (c. 360 CE)
Confrontations with nomadic tribes from Central Asia soon started to occur. Ammianus Marcellinus reports that in 356 CE, Shapur II was taking his winter quarters on his eastern borders, "repelling the hostilities of the bordering tribes" of the Chionites and the Euseni ("Euseni" is usually amended to "Cuseni", meaning the Kushans), finally making a treaty of alliance with the Chionites and the Gelani in 358 CE.

From around 360 CE, however, during his reign, the Sasanids lost the control of Bactria to invaders from the north, first the Kidarites, then the Hephthalites and the Alchon Huns, who would follow up with the invasion of India. These invaders initially issued coins based on Sasanian designs. Various coins minted in Bactria and based on a Sasanian designs are known, often with busts imitating Sasanian kings Shapur II (r. 309 to 379 CE) and Shapur III (r. 383 to 388 CE), adding the Alchon Tamgha and the name "Alchono" in Bactrian script on the obverse, and with attendants to a fire altar on the reverse.

 Death and succession 
Shapur died in 379 and was succeeded by his slightly younger brother Ardashir II, who agreed to rule till Shapur's son Shapur III reached adulthood. By Shapur's death the Sasanian Empire was stronger than ever before, considerably larger than when he came to the throne, the eastern and western enemies were pacified and Persia had gained control over Armenia. He is regarded as one of the most important Sassanian kings along with Shapur I and Khosrow I, and could after a long period of instability regain the old strength of the Empire. His three successors, however, were less successful than he. Furthermore, his death marked the start of a 125-year-long conflict between the wuzurgan, a powerful group of nobility, and the kings, who both struggled for power over Iran.

 Relations with the Christians 

Initially, Shapur II was not hostile to his Christian subjects, who were led by Shemon Bar Sabbae, the Patriarch of the Church of the East, however, the conversion of Constantine the Great to Christianity caused Shapur to start distrusting his Christian subjects. He started seeing them as agents of a foreign enemy. The wars between the Sasanian and Roman empires turned Shapur's mistrust into hostility. After the death of Constantine, Shapur II, who had been preparing for a war against the Romans for several years, imposed a double tax on his Christian subjects to finance the conflict. Shemon, however, refused to pay the double tax. Shapur started pressuring Shemon and his clergy to convert to Zoroastrianism, which they refused to do. It was during this period the 'cycle of the martyrs' began during which 'many thousands of Christians' were put to death. During the following years, Shemon's successors, Shahdost and Barba'shmin, were also martyred.

Barbasceminus, bishop of Seleucia and Ctesiphon from 342, was executed on 14 January 346 with sixteen of his clergy.
A near-contemporary fifth-century Christian work, the Ecclesiastical History of Sozomen, contains considerable detail on the Persian Christians martyred under Shapur II. Sozomen estimates the total number of Christians killed as follows:

 Imperial beliefs and numismatics 

According to Ammianus Marcellinus, Shapur II fought the Romans in order to "re-conquer what had belonged to his ancestor". It is not known who Shapur II thought his ancestor was, probably the Achaemenids or the legendary Kayanian dynasty. During the reign of Shapur II, the title of "the divine Mazda-worshipping, king of kings of the Iranians, whose image/seed is from the gods" disappears from the coins that were minted. He was also the last Sasanian king to claim lineage from the gods.

Under Shapur II, coins were minted in copper, silver and gold, however, a great amount of the copper coins were made on Roman planchet, which is most likely from the riches that the Sasanians took from the Romans. The weight of the coins also changed from 7.20 g to 4.20 g.

 Constructions 
Besides the construction of the war-i tāzigān near al-Hira, Shapur II is also known to have created several other cities. He created a royal city called Eranshahr-Shapur, where he settled Roman prisoners of war. He also rebuilt and repopulated Nisibis in 363 with people from Istakhr and Spahan. In Asoristan, he founded Wuzurg-Shapur ("Great Shapur"), a city on the west side of the Tigris. He also rebuilt Susa after having destroyed it when suppressing a revolt, renaming it Eran-Khwarrah-Shapur ("Iran's glory [built by] Shapur").

 Contributions 
Under Shapur II's reign the collection of the Avesta was completed, heresy and apostasy punished, and the Christians persecuted (see Abdecalas, Acepsimas of Hnaita and Abda of Kashkar). This was a reaction against the Christianization of the Roman Empire by Constantine.

 Religious beliefs 
According to Armenian and primary sources, the Sasanian shahs revered the sun and the moon, with Roman sources stating that Shapur II asserted to be the "brother of the Sun and the Moon" (Latin: frater Solis et Lunae). This is however not mentioned in Sasanian sources, which implies that there are two possibilities; one that it is regarding about the angelic divinity Mithra, whilst the other one being that it may be an Indo-Iranian characteristic where the shahs considered their ancestors descendants of Manuchehr (Indic Manu) and his father Wiwahvant (Indic Vivasvant), who were in India associated with the Moon and the Sun.

Shapur's own religious beliefs does not seem to have been very strict; he restored the family cult of Anahita in Istakhr and was possibly an adherent of Zurvanism as well as promoting the official orthodox variant of Zoroastrianism.

Offspring
His daughters include:
Zruanduxt
Zurvandukht: She was named after Zurvan, a deity in Zoroastrianism. 
 
Notes

References

 Bibliography 
 Ancient works 
Ammianus Marcellinus, Res Gestae''

Modern works 
 

 
 
 

 
 
 
 
 
 
  

 
 
 
 
 
 
 
 

 
309 births
379 deaths
Ancient child monarchs
People of the Roman–Sasanian Wars
4th-century Sasanian monarchs
People from Firuzabad, Fars
Shahnameh characters
Julian's Persian expedition
City founders